In the 10th edition of Systema Naturae, Carl Linnaeus classified the arthropods, including insects, arachnids and crustaceans, among his class "Insecta". Wingless arthropods were brought together under the name Aptera.

Lepisma (silverfish)
 Lepisma saccharina 
 Lepisma terrestris – [nomen dubium]

Podura (springtails)

 Podura viridis – Sminthurus viridis 
 Podura atra – Dicyrtoma atra 
 Podura fusca – Allacma fusca 
 Podura plumbea – Pogonognathellus flavescens 
 Podura nivalis – Entomobrya nivalis 
 Podura arborea – Vertagopus arboreus 
 Podura cincta – Orchesella cincta 
 Podura aquatica – Podura aquatica 
 Podura fimetaria – Folsomia fimetaria 
 Podura ambulans – Onychiurus ambulans

Termes (termites and Psocoptera)
 Termes fatale – Termes fatalis 
 Termes pulsatorium – Trogium pulsatorium 
 Termes fatidicum – Lachesilla pedicularia

Pediculus (lice)

 Pediculus humanus – head louse 
 Pediculus pubis – crab louse 
 Pediculus ricinoides
 Pediculus vespertilionis – [suppressed] 
 Pediculus suis – Haematopinus suis 
 Pediculus porcelli – [nomen nudum] 
 Pediculus cameli – Microthoracius cameli 
 Pediculus cervi – Lipoptena cervi 
 Pediculus ovis – [nomen nudum] 
 Pediculus bovis – Bovicola bovis 
 Pediculus vituli – Linognathus vituli 
 Pediculus equi – [nomen nudum] 
 Pediculus asini – Haematopinus asini 
 Pediculus tinnunculi – Laemobothrion tinnunculi 
 Pediculus corvi – Philopterus corvi 
 Pediculus infausti
 Pediculus picae – Myrsidea picae 
 Pediculus cygni – Ornithobius cygni 
 Pediculus anseris – Anaticola anseris 
 Pediculus moschatae – Acidoproctus moschatae 
 Pediculus querquedulae – Trinoton querquedulae 
 Pediculus sternae – Saemundssonia sternae 
 Pediculus plataleae – Ardeicola plataleae 
 Pediculus ardeae – Ardeicola ardeae 
 Pediculus gruis – Esthiopterum gruis 
 Pediculus ciconiae – Ardeicola ciconiae 
 Pediculus charadrii – Quadraceps charadrii 
 Pediculus fulicae – Incidifrons fulicae 
 Pediculus recurvirostrae – Cirrophthirius recurvirostrae 
 Pediculus haematopi – Saemundssonia haematopi 
 Pediculus pavonis – Goniodes pavonis 
 Pediculus meleagridis – Chelopistes meleagridis 
 Pediculus gallinae – Menopon gallinae
 Pediculus caponis – Lipeurus caponis 
 Pediculus tetraonis – Goniodes tetraonis 
 Pediculus lagopi – Goniodes lagopi 
 Pediculus columbae – Columbicola columbae 
 Pediculus pari
 Pediculus apis

Pulex (fleas)
 Pulex irritans – human flea 
 Pulex penetrans – chigoe flea Tunga penetrans

Acarus (mites & ticks)

 Acarus elephantinus
 Acarus aegyptius – Hyalomma aegyptium 
 Acarus reduvius, Acarus ricinus & Acarus sanguisugus – Ixodes ricinus 
 Acarus americanus – Amblyomma americanum 
 Acarus cancroides – Chelifer cancroides 
 Acarus scorpioides – Cordylochernes scorpioides 
 Acarus crassipes – Pergamasus crassipes 
 Acarus passerinus – Analges passerinus 
 Acarus motatorius – Linopodes motatorius
 Acarus aphidioides – Asca aphidoides 
 Acarus coleoptratus – Achipteria coleoptrata 
 Acarus telarius – Eotetranychus telarius 
 Acarus siro – flour mite 
 Acarus exulcerans
 Acarus geniculatus – Lucoppia geniculata 
 Acarus aquaticus – Limnochares aquaticus 
 Acarus holosericeus – Trombidium holosericeum 
 Acarus baccarum – Anystis baccarum
 Acarus muscarum – Myianoetus muscarum 
 Acarus batatas – Eutrombicula batatas
 Acarus gymnopterorum
 Acarus coleoptratorum – Parasitus coleoptratorum 
 Acarus rupestris – Erythraeus rupestris
 Acarus longicornis – Bdella longicornis 
 Acarus littoralis – Neomolgus littoralis 
 Acarus fungorum – Humerobates rostrolamellatus 
 Acarus scaber – [species inquirenda]
 Acarus salicinus – Anystis salicinus 
 Acarus croceus – [species inquirenda], Tydeus sp.

Phalangium (harvestmen, Amblypygi, Uropygi)

 Phalangium opilio 
 Phalangium caudatum – Thelyphonus caudatus 
 Phalangium reniforme – Phrynus ceylonicus C.L. Koch, 1843

Aranea (spiders)

 Aranea diadema – European garden spider 
 Aranea reticulata – Metellina segmentata 
 Aranea cucurbitina – Araniella cucurbitina 
 Aranea calycina – Misumena vatia 
 Aranea bipunctata – Steatoda bipunctata 
 Aranea arundinacea – Dictyna arundinacea 
 Aranea angulata – Araneus angulatus 
 Aranea domestica – Tegenaria domestica 
 Aranea lineata – Stemonyphantes lineatus 
 Aranea riparia & Aranea labyrinthica – Agelena labyrinthica 
 Aranea redimita – Enoplognatha ovata 
 Aranea corollata – [nomen dubium] 
 Aranea fumigata – Pardosa amentata 
 Aranea montana – Linyphia triangularis 
 Aranea notata – Phylloneta sisyphia 
 Aranea rufipes – Gongylidium rufipes 
 Aranea nocturna – Callilepis nocturna 
 Aranea extensa – Tetragnatha extensa 
 Aranea fimbriata, Aranea palustris & Aranea virescens – raft spider 
 Aranea sexpunctata – Nuctenea umbratica 
 Aranea flavissima
 Aranea quadripunctata – Scotophaeus quadripunctatus 
 Aranea holosericea – Clubiona pallidula 
 Aranea senoculata – Segestria senoculata 
 Aranea avicularia – pinktoe tarantula 
 Aranea ocellata – [nomen dubium] 
 Aranea tarantula – Lycosa tarantula 
 Aranea scenica – zebra spider 
 Aranea truncorum – [nomen dubium] 
 Aranea rupestris – Evarcha falcata 
 Aranea aquatica – diving bell spider 
 Aranea saccata – Pardosa amentata 
 Aranea viatica – Xysticus cristatus 
 Aranea levipes – Philodromus margaritatus 
 Aranea cancriformis – Gasteracantha cancriformis 
 Aranea spinosa – Micrathena spinosa

Scorpio (scorpions)

 Scorpio maurus 
 Scorpio afer – [nomen dubium] 
 Scorpio americus – [nomen dubium] 
 Scorpio europaeus – [suppressed] 
 Scorpio australis – Androctonus australis

Cancer (crabs, lobsters & kin)

Brachyuri (crabs)

Cancer cursor – Ocypode cursor 
Cancer raninus – Ranina ranina 
Cancer mutus – Tetralia muta 
Cancer minutus – Planes minutus 
Cancer ruricola – Gecarcinus ruricola 
Cancer vocans – Uca vocans 
Cancer craniolaris – Leucosia craniolaris 
Cancer philargius – Calappa philargius 
Cancer rhomboides – Goneplax rhomboides 
Cancer maculatus – Carpilius maculatus 
Cancer pelagicus – Portunus pelagicus 
Cancer nucleus – Ilia nucleus 
Cancer lactatus
Cancer maenas – Carcinus maenas 
Cancer depurator – Liocarcinus depurator 
Cancer feriatus – Charybdis feriata 
Cancer granulatus – Calappa granulata 
Cancer pagurus 
Cancer chabrus – Plagusia chabrus 
Cancer araneus – great spider crab 
Cancer cuphaeus
Cancer muscosus – Pisa muscosa 
Cancer personatus – Dromia personata 
Cancer pinnotheres – Nepinnotheres pinnotheres 
Cancer maja – Lithodes maja 
Cancer longimanus – Parthenope longimanus 
Cancer horridus – Daldorfia horrida 
Cancer cristatus – Micippa cristata 
Cancer superciliosus – Criocarcinus superciliosus 
Cancer cornutus – Maja cornuta 
Cancer longipes – Phalangipus longipes 
Cancer spinifer – [nomen dubium] 
Cancer cruentatus – Lissa chiragra 
Cancer hepaticus – Calappa hepatica 
Cancer calappa – Calappa calappa 
Cancer grapsus – Grapsus grapsus 
Cancer aeneus – Zosimus aeneus 
Cancer punctatus – Persephona punctata 
Cancer dorsipes – Notopus dorsipes 
Cancer symmysta – Albunea symmysta

Macrouri

Cancer bernhardus – Pagurus bernhardus 
Cancer diogenes – Petrochirus diogenes 
Cancer gammarus – European lobster 
Cancer astacus – Astacus astacus 
Cancer carcinus – Macrobrachium carcinus 
Cancer pennaceus – Leander tenuicornis 
Cancer squilla – Palaemon adspersus 
Cancer crangon – Crangon crangon 
Cancer carabus – Albunea carabus 
Cancer cancharus – possibly Galathea strigosa 
Cancer pilosus
Cancer norvegicus – Norway lobster 
Cancer homarus – Panulirus homarus 
Cancer arctus – Scyllarus arctus 
Cancer mantis – Squilla mantis 
Cancer scyllarus – peacock mantis shrimp 
Cancer pulex – Gammarus pulex 
Cancer locusta – Gammarus locusta 
Cancer salinus – Artemia salina 
Cancer stagnalis – Tanymastix stagnalis

Monoculus (branchiopods & kin)

 Monoculus polyphemus – Atlantic horseshoe crab 
 Monoculus foliaceus – Argulus foliaceus 
 Monoculus apus – Lepidurus apus 
 Monoculus pulex – Daphnia pulex 
 Monoculus pediculus – Polyphemus pediculus 
 Monoculus quadricornis – Cyclops quadricornis 
 Monoculus conchaceus – Cypris conchacea 
 Monoculus lenticularis – Limnadia lenticularis 
 Monoculus telemus – Cavolinia tridentata (Forskål, 1775) (a mollusc)

Oniscus (woodlice)

 Oniscus asilus
 Oniscus oestrum – Cymothoa oestrum 
 Oniscus psora – Aega psora 
 Oniscus physodes – Anilocra physodes 
 Oniscus entomon – Saduria entomon 
 Oniscus ceti – Cyamus ceti 
 Oniscus marinus – Idotea marina 
 Oniscus scopulorum – Cymothoa scopulorum 
 Oniscus aquaticus – Asellus aquaticus 
 Oniscus asellus 
 Oniscus armadillo – [nomen dubium]

Scolopendra (centipedes)

 Scolopendra lagura – Polyxenus lagurus 
 Scolopendra coleoptrata – Scutigera coleoptrata 
 Scolopendra forficata – Lithobius forficatus 
 Scolopendra gigantea 
 Scolopendra morsitans 
 Scolopendra electrica – Geophilus electricus 
 Scolopendra phosphorea – Orphnaeus brevilabiatus 
 Scolopendra occidentalis – [nomen dubium] 
 Scolopendra marina

Julus (millipedes)
 Julus ovalis – Cryxus ovalis 
 Julus crassus
 Julus terrestris 
 Julus indus – Spirostreptus indus 
 Julus sabulosus – Ommatoiulus sabulosus 
 Julus fuscus 
 Julus maximus – Spirocyclistus maximus

Notes

References

Systema Naturae
 Systema Naturae, Aptera